The Trujillo Spring Festival is a festival and cultural event that takes place in the Peruvian city of Trujillo, between the end of September and beginning of October each year. This spring festival  is considered one of the most representative of  Trujillo city and honors its nickname  of City of the everlasting spring. This festival is also one of the largest in the country and attracts the attendance of thousands of tourists from around the planet. The main attraction of this festival is a traditional Corsican or spring parade, involving mainly beauty queens of Lions clubs across the continent; in the parade there's a competition in the decoration about spring allegory and to be honored with the award called the gold lion. It is organized by the Lions Club of Trujillo.

History
The first Trujillo spring festival was held in 1950, and since that time has been held each year with the presence of  many visitors from all around the world. The organization is in charge of the Lions Club of Trujillo. The International Spring Festival was formalized by Supreme Decree No. 15 of May 31, 1961 and by Act of Congress No. 15621 of September 28, 1965 which Trujillo was appointed with the title of "Capital of Spring" for the first government of Fernando Belaunde Terry. In recent editions of the festival artistic presentations are made in various parts of the city. By the 61st International Spring Festival, through regional ordinance on September 30, 2011, in the province of Trujillo was declared a holiday.

Characters of the festival
Queens
Guaripolas
Musician bands
Dance groups
Allegoric cars

Gallery

Peruvian paso in spring
During Trujillo spring festival in September and October there is peruvian paso contest. Trujillo is known and considered as the Cradle of the typical Peruvian Paso Horse as well as the Capital of Culture of Peru so as the Capital of the Marinera dance and as the city of the everlasting spring.

Queens of Trujillo Spring festival

See also

 Trujillo Marinera Festival
 San Jose Festival
 International Festival of Lyric Singing
 Santiago de Huamán
 Victor Larco Herrera District
 Historic Centre of Trujillo
 Trujillo Book Festival

References

External links

 Map of Trujillo, the city of this Spring festival

Media
 
 

Festivals in Trujillo, Peru